Backbone Entertainment was an American video game developer based in Emeryville, California. The company was formed in 2003 as the result of a merger between developers Digital Eclipse and ImaginEngine. In 2005, Backbone merged with The Collective to form Foundation 9 Entertainment.

History 
Backbone Entertainment was formed in 2003 through a merger between Digital Eclipse, a developer of emulations of arcade games, and ImaginEngine, an edutainment games developer. ImaginEngine remained an independent studio, based in Framingham, Massachusetts, while Digital Eclipse's studios were absorbed by Backbone, becoming Backbone Emeryville and Backbone Vancouver, respectively. In 2004, in co-operation with the University of Hawaii, Backbone opened an office in Honolulu, Hawaii, under the lead of Backbone's chairman, Mark Loughridge. On March 29, 2005, Backbone Entertainment announced that it was merging with another developer, The Collective, to form Foundation 9 Entertainment. By this point, Backbone also operated Games2Learn, another edutainment game developer. Later in 2005, Backbone first rose to prominence with the release of Death Jr., a game for PlayStation Portable.

In February 2006, Backbone opened another subsidiary studio, Backbone Charlottetown, in Charlottetown, Prince Edward Island, Canada, under the lead of Andrew Ayre. In May 2007, the new studio, including Ayre and several former Digital Eclipse employees, spun off from Backbone and became Other Ocean Interactive, aiming at showcasing Digital Eclipse's former traits in a smaller fashion. In September 2008, Backbone let go most people employed at its Vancouver studio, followed by a full closure of the studio in May 2009. In October 2012, Backbone laid off the majority of its Emeryville-based staff to avoid closing completely. A few days later, it was reported that ImaginEngine had shut down, leaving 25 people, including studio head Randall Sanborn, out of work.

Subsidiaries 
 Backbone Charlottetown (2006–2007)
 Backbone Emeryville (2003–2015)
 Backbone Vancouver (2003–2009)
 Games2Learn
 ImaginEngine (2003–2012)

Games developed

References 

American companies established in 2003
American companies disestablished in 2015
2003 establishments in California
2015 disestablishments in California
Companies based in Emeryville, California
Video game companies based in California
Video game companies established in 2003
Video game companies disestablished in 2015
Video game development companies
Defunct video game companies of the United States
Defunct companies based in the San Francisco Bay Area